Elections to Lambeth London Borough Council were held on 2 May 2002. The whole council was up for election with boundary changes reducing the number of councillors by one since the last election in 1998. Labour despite having the largest number of votes with 36.6% of the vote, it still lost 13 seats, while the Lib Dems and the Tories gained seats, resulting in Labour losing control of the Council and no party having a majority.

Following the election, the Liberal Democrats and Conservatives formed a coalition to run the council with Cllr Peter Truesdale, Liberal Democrat, as Leader and Cllr John Whelan, Conservative, as Deputy Leader.

Election result

|}

Ward results

Bishop's

Brixton Hill

Clapham Common

Clapham Town

Coldharbour

Ferndale

Gipsy Hill

Herne Hill

Knight's Hill

Larkhall

Oval

Prince's

St Leonard's

Stockwell

Streatham Hill

Streatham South

Streatham Wells

Thornton

Thurlow Park

Tulse Hill

Vassall

References

2002
2002 London Borough council elections
21st century in the London Borough of Lambeth